The Soldado Formation is a geologic formation in Trinidad and Tobago. It preserves fossils dating back to the Thanetian to Bartonian period.

Fossil content 
 Cimomia kugleri, C. subrecta
 Hercoglossa harrisi

See also 
 List of fossiliferous stratigraphic units in Trinidad and Tobago

References

Further reading 
 A. K. Miller and M. L. Thompson. 1937. Beiträge zur Kenntnis tropisch-americkanischer Tertiärmollusken. VI. Some Tertiary nautiloids from Venezuela and Trinidad. Ecologae Geologicae Helvetiae 30(1):59-73

Geologic formations of Trinidad and Tobago
Paleogene Trinidad and Tobago
Limestone formations
Shallow marine deposits